The soda siphon (sometimes spelled syphon), also known as the seltzer bottle or siphon seltzer bottle, is a device for storing and dispensing carbonated beverages (typically carbonated water) while maintaining the internal pressure, thereby preventing it from going flat.

History 

As early as 1790, the concept of an "aerosol" was introduced in France, with self-pressurized carbonated beverages. The modern siphon was created in 1829, when two Frenchmen patented a hollow corkscrew which could be inserted into a soda bottle and, by use of a valve, allowed a portion of the contents to be dispensed while maintaining the pressure on the inside of the bottle and preventing the remaining soda from going flat.

Soda siphons were popular in the 1920s and 1930s.  The rise of bottled carbonated beverages and the destruction of many of the siphon manufacturers' plants in Eastern Europe during World War II led to a decline in their popularity in the years after the war. These bottles are still commonly used in some bars to make drinks.

Modern-day production 

Commercial production and delivery of pre-filled bottles of seltzer continued in the Southern California and Eastern Seaboard regions of the U.S. into 2009. As of 2009, such delivery service continues in Argentina (nationwide), Vienna, Austria by Brauerei Ottakringer and in Toronto, Ontario, Canada. As of 2015, Coca-Cola Mexico began distributing its Ciel-branded mineral water in 1.75 litre plastic siphon bottles with a reusable plastic head assembly. In the UK, Adcocks Syphons remains the sole producer and bottler of siphons operating in the country, with several stockists selling their product throughout the country.

Filling 
For making single-use sealed bottles, or commercially refillable bottles in a seltzer plant, the bottles are first washed and then evacuated using a vacuum pump and a rubber hose slipped over the nozzle. The bottle with most of the air removed is then held upside-down under the surface of a tub of carbonated water, which is drawn into the bottle by the vacuum inside when the valve is opened. Sometimes a pump is used to force higher pressure into the bottle.

For portable 1 litre bottles, the head of the siphon bottle is removed for filling. A rubber seal and tube are also removed. Then about 1 litre of very cold water is added to the bottle; the bottle is not completely filled. The rubber seal, tube, and head are then reassembled. An 8-gram CO2 charger is inserted and securely screwed into a port in the head; the port has a conical seal and a hollow pin that pierces the charger and lets the gas into the bottle. When the sound of the gas bubbling into the water is heard, the bottle is shaken, then left to rest. Within seconds, the trigger pull will release seltzer water.

See also
Soda machine (home appliance)
Carbonated water
Carbonation
Gasogene
 Whipping siphon, for making whipped cream with compressed gas

References

Carbonated water